Lymanske is an urban-type settlement in Rozdilna Raion of Odesa Oblast in Ukraine. It belongs to Lymanske settlement hromada, one of the hromadas of Ukraine. Lymanske is located along the east side of the Kuchurhan Reservoir on the border with Transnistria in Moldova. Population: 

The villages of Selz (named after Seltz in Alsace) and Kandel were established at this location along the Kuchurhan River in 1808 by Roman Catholic German and Alsatian (French citizens) immigrants to the Kutschurhan Valley, then part of the Russian Empire.  It received its present name after the remaining German residents were driven from the area by the advancing Soviet army in 1944.

History
Lymanske, as well as many of the surrounding settlements, originally began as a German agricultural colony. Germans began settling in southern Ukraine and the Crimean Peninsula in the late 18th century, but the bulk of immigration and settlement occurred during the Napoleonic period, from 1800 onward, with a concentration in the years 1803 to 1805. At the time, southern Ukraine was part of the Russian Empire. Designated New Russia, and often colloquially South Russia (or Südrussland by its German-speaking inhabitants), these lands had been annexed by the Russian Empire during the reign of Catherine the Great after successful wars against the Ottoman Empire (1768–1774) and the Crimean Khanate (1783). The first German settlers arrived in 1798 from Southwestern Germany and Alsace, France. Tsar Alexander I (grandson of Catherine the Great), invited German settlers to develop the land in the newly acquired territory north of the Black Sea.

The Catholic Germans who settled Lymanske during the reign Alexander I were assured numerous "special privileges." These included: free land, exemption from military and civil service, tax-free loans, local self-government, and freedom of religion. As they developed the area, the German settlers were allowed to maintain their German language, folkways, and identity as German colonists.

Selz 

The colony of Selz was established in 1798. Groups of settlers arrived in two parties in 1808 under the leadership of Jakob Steinhäuser and Michael Scherr.  The land for the settlers was obtained by Duke de Richelieu from three Russian families. The original colonists consisted of 100 families, 205 males and 196 females.  The colonists came from various German provinces.  From the province of Lower Alsace there were 95 families with 196 males and 186 females.  From Prussia, there were 2 families with 2 males and 2 females.  From Austria, there was one family with one man and one woman.  The homeland of the two remaining families is unknown.  

The Kutschurhan District office was located in Selz until 1871 and covered the colonies of Selz, Kandel, Baden, Strassburg, Mannheim and Elsass.  In 1908 Selz housed the Volost Office for only Selz and Kandel.  The other colonies established separate Volost Offices for themselves.  Selz also had the first parish church in the Kutschurhan District, the parish having been founded in 1811. Prior to that time, colonists were served from Josephsthal.  In 1821 the first church was built, but by 1830 the building was in need of repair and was remodeled on numerous occasions over the years.  In 1901 the spacious, beautiful Cathedral of the Assumption of the Blessed Virgin Mary was completed.

Kandel 

The village of Kandel rests on the banks of the Kutschurhan Liman. Before the first German Catholic arrivals in 1808 and 1809, however, a Gypsy (Roma) settlement stood in the vicinity. The colonists first arrived in July 1808. Kandel was apportioned 24,923 acres of land. According to the 1811 census, Kandel had 104 families, numbering 480 souls. 

Kandel did not have its own church until 1828. Villagers would attend services at Selz, 2 miles north of Kandel. The first mayor of Kandel was Sebastian Sahli. 
Like its namesake in the ancestral town in Palatinate, Germany, Kandel consisted of a long street which stretched almost two kilometers. In later times a shorter parallel street was added and became known as Bergstrasse. In the centennial year of 1908 Kandel had a population of 2,522, which represented a six-fold increase in the course of 100 years. There were 269 house and farmyards which provided accommodation for more than 350 families.

Apart from grain farming, the people of Kandel carried on extensive truck-farming and viniculture on 150 acres of garden land; the fruit orchards that covered over 275 acres produced excellent crops of apricots, plums, and cherries for home consumption and for the market. Kandel also had 77 artisans and craftsmen who produced a variety of agricultural implements in iron and wood; there were also many basket weavers and broom makers.

The beautiful stone Trinity Church, was built in 1892 and was consecrated by Bishop Anton Zerr. Kandel had two large schools, with 4 teachers for the 375 and more school children of the village.

1900 – 1944 
Prior to the turn of the century, a wave of emigration of the Russian German community began after the reforms of Alexander II. In 1871, he repealed the open-door immigration policy of his ancestors. The resulting disaffection motivated many Russian Germans, especially members of traditionally dissenting churches, to migrate to the United States and Canada, while many Catholics chose Brazil and Argentina. 

The Russian Civil War of 1919 hit the Selz people especially hard when during early August the farmers attempted a three-day stand against General Grigori Kotovski’s Bolshevist cavalry regiment and finally lost. The Bolsheviks took revenge by massacring 111 men and women of Selz. During the time of the Great Terror of 1937/1938 the population was reduced by 15 percent. This great loss caused the government to keep the results of a 1939 census secret.

During early August of 1941 the German air force staged air attacks on Selz, Kandel and Baden, two people lost their lives. Explosive and fire bombs destroyed homes and stables. In two villages, livestock also became victims of the air attacks. The residents hid in cellars and camps for several days, until on Sunday, August 10, Romanian soldiers and a mounted officer arrived from the South and marched first into Kandel, then into the other villages, and declared their sovereign rule over the settlements. They were followed immediately by an SS-unit arriving on foot. Within two weeks, the SS identified all leaders of the collectives, leaders of village councils, village activists, as well as children from mixed German-Jewish families and executed them in secrecy. 

From 1942 on, the villages came under political administration by Police Commissariat 23. The villagers restored their churches as much as possible, and religious services held by Catholic military clergy from Romania were permitted, but only under military supervision. Once again, the language of commerce was German, and school instruction was conducted with the help of textbooks imported from Germany. A March 12, 1944 announcement ordered the population to prepare for “administrative resettlement.” The people of Kandel, initially heading toward Franzfeld, were the first to leave. The Selz people's turn came only six days later. Because the authorities had abandoned the Selz residents, they wandered around for days until some men discovered a ferry near Mayaki. After two thirds of the people and wagons had reached the western side successfully, a Soviet artillery grenade hit the ferry and sank people and horses. 76 other wagons and 450 Selz residents were captured and sentenced to life in labor camps, while the women and children were deported to the northern Urals. The formerly unified village communities of the Selz colonist district thus ceased to exist. It was the end of their 136-year history.

Notable people 
Valentin Edward Hoffinger (1901 – 1976) a professional ice hockey player.

See also
 Flight and evacuation of German civilians during the end of World War II
 Black Sea Germans
 Bessarabia Germans
 Selz, North Dakota

References

External links

  Lymans'ke
 Selz Village Information
 Kutschurgan Map
 Founders of the Village of Selz

Urban-type settlements in Rozdilna Raion
Populated places established in 1808
Moldova–Ukraine border
Former German settlements in Odesa Oblast
1808 establishments in Ukraine